Neerwinden is a village in Belgium in the province of Flemish Brabant, a few miles southeast of Tienen. It is now part of the municipality of Landen.

The village gave its name to two great battles. The first battle was fought in 1693 between the Anglo-Allied army under William III of England and the French under the duke of Luxemburg, ending in a French victory. (This battle, during the War of the Grand Alliance, is usually called the Battle of Landen.) The second battle took place in 1793 between Austria under Prince Josias of Coburg and the French under General Charles François Dumouriez and ended in an Austrian victory.

External links

Populated places in Flemish Brabant
Landen